Adoptionism, also called dynamic monarchianism, is an early Christian nontrinitarian theological doctrine, which holds that Jesus was adopted as the Son of God at his baptism, his resurrection, or his ascension. How common adoptionist views were among early Christians is debated, but it appears to have been most popular in the first, second, and third centuries. Some scholars see adoptionism as the belief of the earliest followers of Jesus, based on the epistles of Paul and other early literature. However, adoptionist views sharply declined in prominence in the fourth and fifth centuries, as Church leaders condemned it as a heresy.

Definition
Adoptionism is one of two main forms of monarchianism (the other being modalism, which considers God to be one while working through the different "modes" or "manifestations" of God the Father, God the Son, and God the Holy Spirit, without limiting his modes or manifestations). Adoptionism denies the eternal pre-existence of Christ, and although it explicitly affirms his deity subsequent to events in his life, many classical trinitarians claim that the doctrine implicitly denies it by denying the constant hypostatic union of the eternal Logos to the human nature of Jesus. Under adoptionism, Jesus is divine and has been since his adoption, although he is not equal to the Father, per "my Father is greater than I" and as such is a kind of subordinationism. Adoptionism is sometimes, but not always, related to denial of the virgin birth of Jesus.

History

Early Christianity

Adoptionism and high Christology

Bart Ehrman holds that the New Testament writings contain two different Christologies, namely a "low" or adoptionist Christology, and a "high" or "incarnation Christology." The "low Christology" or "adoptionist Christology" is the belief "that God exalted Jesus to be his Son by raising him from the dead," thereby raising him to "divine status." The other early Christology is "high Christology," which is "the view that Jesus was a pre-existent divine being who became a human, did the Father's will on earth, and then was taken back up into heaven whence he had originally come," and from where he appeared on earth. The chronology of the development of these early Christologies is a matter of debate within contemporary scholarship.

According to the "evolutionary model" or evolutionary theories proposed by Bousset, followed by Brown, the Christological understanding of Christ developed over time, from a low Christology to a high Christology, as witnessed in the Gospels. According to the evolutionary model, the earliest Christians believed that Jesus was a human who was exalted, and thus adopted as God's Son, when he was resurrected, signaling the nearness of the Kingdom of God, when all dead would be resurrected and the righteous exalted. Adoptionist concepts can be found in the Gospel of Mark. As Daniel Johansson notes, a majority consensus holds Mark's Jesus as "an exalted, but merely human figure", especially when read in the apparent context of Jewish beliefs. Later beliefs shifted the exaltation to his baptism, birth, and subsequently to the idea of his eternal existence, as witnessed in the Gospel of John. Mark shifted the moment of when Jesus became the son to the baptism of Jesus, and later still Matthew and Luke shifted it to the moment of the divine conception, and finally John declared that Jesus had been with God from the beginning: "In the beginning was the Word".

One notable passage that may have been cited by early adoptionists was what exactly God said at Jesus's baptism; three different versions are recorded. One of them, found in the Codex Bezae version of Luke 3:22, is "You are my son; today I have begotten you." This seems to be quoted in Acts 13:32–33 as well (in all manuscripts, not just Bezae). Quotes from second and third century Christian writers almost always use this variant as well, with many fourth and fifth century writers continuing to use it, if occasionally with embarrassment; Augustine cites the line, for example, but clarifies God meant an eternal "today". Ehrman speculates that Orthodox scribes of the fourth and fifth century changed the passage in Luke to align with the version in Mark as a defense against adoptionists citing the passage in their favor.

Since the 1970s, the late datings for the development of a "high Christology" have been contested, and a majority of scholars argue that this "high Christology" existed already before the writings of Paul. This "incarnation Christology" or "high Christology" did not evolve over a longer time, but was a "big bang" of ideas which were already present at the start of Christianity, and took further shape in the first few decades of the church, as witnessed in the writings of Paul.

According to Ehrman, these two Christologies existed alongside each other, calling the "low Christology" an "adoptionist Christology, and "the "high Christology" an "incarnation Christology."

New Testamental epistles
Adoptionist theology may also be reflected in canonical epistles, the earliest of which pre-date the writing of the gospels. The letters of Paul the Apostle, for example, do not mention a virgin birth of Christ. Paul describes Jesus as "born of a woman, born under the law" and "as to his human nature was a descendant of David" in the Epistle to the Galatians and the Epistle to the Romans. Christian interpreters, however, take his statements in Philippians 2 to imply that Paul believed Jesus to have existed as equal to God before his incarnation.

Shepherd of Hermas
The 2nd-century work Shepherd of Hermas may also have taught that Jesus was a virtuous man filled with the Holy Spirit and adopted as the Son. While the Shepherd of Hermas was popular and sometimes bound with the canonical scriptures, it did not retain canonical status, if it ever had it.

Theodotus of Byzantium
Theodotus of Byzantium ( late 2nd century), a Valentinian Gnostic, was the most prominent exponent of adoptionism. According to Hippolytus of Rome (Philosophumena, VII, xxiii) Theodotus taught that Jesus was a man born of a virgin, according to the Council of Jerusalem, that he lived like other men, and was most pious. At his baptism in the Jordan the "Christ" came down upon the man Jesus, in the likeness of a dove (Philosophumena, VII, xxiii), but Jesus was not himself God until after his resurrection.

Adoptionism was declared heresy at the end of the 3rd century and was rejected by the Synods of Antioch and the First Council of Nicaea, which defined the orthodox doctrine of the Trinity and identified the man Jesus with the eternally begotten Son or Word of God in the Nicene Creed. The belief was also declared heretical by Pope Victor I.

Ebionites

Adoptionism was also adhered to by the Jewish Christians known as Ebionites, who, according to Epiphanius in the 4th century, believed that Jesus was chosen on account of his sinless devotion to the will of God.

The Ebionites were a Jewish Christian movement that existed during the early centuries of the Christian Era. They show strong similarities with the earliest form of Jewish Christianity, and their specific theology may have been a "reaction to the law-free Gentile mission." They regarded Jesus as the Messiah while rejecting his divinity and his virgin birth, and insisted on the necessity of following Jewish law and rites. They used the Gospel of the Ebionites, one of the Jewish–Christian gospels; the Hebrew Book of Matthew starting at chapter 3; revered James the brother of Jesus (James the Just); and rejected Paul the Apostle as an apostate from the Law. Their name (derived from the Hebrew , meaning  or ) suggests that they placed a special value on voluntary poverty.

Distinctive features of the Gospel of the Ebionites include the absence of the virgin birth and of the genealogy of Jesus; an Adoptionist Christology, in which Jesus is chosen to be God's Son at the time of his Baptism; the abolition of the Jewish sacrifices by Jesus; and an advocacy of vegetarianism.

Spanish Adoptionism 

Spanish Adoptionism was a theological position which was articulated in Umayyad and Christian-held regions of the Iberian peninsula in the 8th and 9th centuries. The issue seems to have begun with the claim of archbishop Elipandus of Toledo that – in respect to his human nature – Christ was adoptive Son of God. Another leading advocate of this Christology was Felix of Urgel. In Spain, adoptionism was opposed by Beatus of Liebana, and in the Carolingian territories, the Adoptionist position was condemned by Pope Hadrian I, Alcuin of York, Agobard, and officially in Carolingian territory by the Council of Frankfurt (794).

Despite the shared name of "adoptionism" the Spanish Adoptionist Christology appears to have differed sharply from the adoptionism of early Christianity. Spanish advocates predicated the term  of Christ only in respect to his humanity; once the divine Son "emptied himself" of divinity and "took the form of a servant" (Philippians 2:7), Christ's human nature was "adopted" as divine.

Historically, many scholars have followed the Adoptionists' Carolingian opponents in labeling Spanish Adoptionism as a minor revival of "Nestorian" Christology. John C. Cavadini has challenged this notion by attempting to take the Spanish Christology in its own Spanish/North African context in his study, The Last Christology of the West: Adoptionism in Spain and Gaul, 785–820.

Scholastic Neo-adoptionism 
A third wave was the revived form ("Neo-adoptionism") of Peter Abelard in the 12th century. Later, various modified and qualified Adoptionist tenets emerged from some theologians in the 14th century. Duns Scotus (1300) and Durandus of Saint-Pourçain (1320) admit the term  in a qualified sense. In more recent times the Jesuit Gabriel Vásquez, and the Lutheran divines Georgius Calixtus and Johann Ernst Immanuel Walch, have defended adoptionism as essentially orthodox.

Modern adoptionist groups 
A form of adoptionism surfaced in Unitarianism during the 18th century as denial of the virgin birth became increasingly common, led by the views of Joseph Priestley and others.

A similar form of adoptionism was expressed in the writings of James Strang, a Latter Day Saint leader who founded the Church of Jesus Christ of Latter Day Saints (Strangite) after the death of Joseph Smith in 1844. In his Book of the Law of the Lord, a purported work of ancient scripture found and translated by Strang, he offers an essay entitled "Note on the Sacrifice of Christ" in which he explains his unique (for Mormonism as a whole) doctrines on the subject. Jesus Christ, said Strang, was the natural-born son of Mary and Joseph, who was chosen from before all time to be the Savior of mankind, but who had to be born as an ordinary mortal of two human parents (rather than being begotten by the Father or the Holy Spirit) to be able to truly fulfill his Messianic role. Strang claimed that the earthly Christ was in essence "adopted" as God's son at birth, and fully revealed as such during the Transfiguration. After proving himself to God by living a perfectly sinless life, he was enabled to provide an acceptable sacrifice for the sins of men, prior to his resurrection and ascension.

See also 
 Adoptivi
 Arianism
 Binitarianism

Notes

References

Sources 
Printed sources

 
 
 
 
 
 
 
 
 
 
 
 
 
 Philip Schaff History of the Christian Church, Volume IV, 1882.
 
  (6th German edition, translated by George Ogg)
 

Web sources

External links 

 Adoptionism in Catholic Encyclopedia
 Adoptionism in Christian Cyclopedia
 Chapter XI. Doctrinal Controversies, from Philip Schaff's History of the Christian Church

Nontrinitarianism
Christian terminology
Heresy in ancient Christianity
Adoption and religion
Nature of Jesus Christ